Serge Livrozet (1939 – 29 November 2022) was a French writer and ex-convict.

Livrozet was born in 1939 in Toulon, France. He was well known for his work advocating against solitary confinement and the death penalty. He also acted, playing the affable criminal Jean-Michel in the 2001 film Time Out (in French: L'Emploi du temps) among other roles.

Livrozet died on 29 November 2022, at the age of 83.

References

External links

1939 births
2022 deaths
French male actors
French male writers
French criminals
Writers from Toulon

French anarchists